Micromonospora sediminis is a bacterium from the genus Micromonospora which has been isolated from mangrove sediments from Chonburi Province, Thailand.

References

External links
Type strain of Micromonospora sediminis at BacDive -  the Bacterial Diversity Metadatabase

 

Micromonosporaceae
Bacteria described in 2016